The 18th Hong Kong Awards ceremony, honored the best films of 1998 and took place on 25 April 1999 at Hong Kong Academy for Performing Arts, Wan Chai, Hong Kong. The ceremony was hosted by Carol Cheng, Cheung Tat Ming, Vincent Kok, Chin Ka Lok and Jerry Lamb, during the ceremony awards are presented in 17 categories.

Awards
Winners are listed first, highlighted in boldface, and indicated with a double dagger.

References

 Official website of the Hong Kong Film Awards

1999
1998 film awards
1999 in Hong Kong
Hong